Instant Mom is an American sitcom developed by Howard Michael Gould and starring Tia Mowry-Hardrict as a stepmother of three children alongside her husband. The series is produced for the NickMom block on Nick Jr., but premieres on Nick at Nite and TV Land. It originally aired from September 29, 2013 to December 19, 2015. It produced the block's best debut ratings in the channel's history. On November 22, 2013, the series was renewed for a second season of 20 episodes. On September 10, 2014, Mowry-Hardrict announced that the series was renewed for a third season. On October 21, 2015, it has been announced that the series has not been renewed for a fourth season and is set to air the series finale in December after 65 episodes produced.

The show debuted on September 29, 2013, and it ran for three seasons, airing 65 episodes total. It ended on December 19, 2015.

Series overview

Episodes

Season 1 (2013–14)
This season consists of 23 episodes.
Sheryl Lee Ralph is absent for five episodes.

Season 2 (2014–15)
This season consists of 16 episodes.
Sheryl Lee Ralph is absent for two episodes.

Season 3 (2015)
Sheryl Lee Ralph is absent for two episodes.

References

External links
 

Lists of American sitcom episodes
Lists of Nickelodeon television series episodes